Aleksandr Vitalyevich Loye (born 26 July 1983) is a Soviet and Russian film and theater actor.

Biography 
He became known in the early 1990s, thanks to a number of commercials and his participation on a children's TV show Yeralash (where he worked from 1990 to 1995).

Since 2004 - the director of television. He graduated from the Shchepkin  Theatre School (2006).

Awards
 2014: XV International TV and Cinema Forum  Together - special prize For a vivid embodiment of the on-screen images of our contemporaries.

Filmography
1988 The noble robber Vladimir Dubrovsky as boy in the estate Troyekurov
1989 Trant Ventoux as Arkanya Fedin, a friend and classmate Egor Tarantino
1990-1995 Yeralash (TV show)
1991 A year of good child as Roma Rogov
1992 Eyes as Arthur, the patient
1992 Weather Is Good on Deribasovskaya, It Rains Again on Brighton Beach as Syoma, Monya's Grandson
1993 Sny as boy buying photo
1993 The lame vnidut first as John Wesley, Mike's son 
1997-2000 Adventure Solnyshkina (TV Series) as Solnyshkin
2001 Next (TV Series) as Fedya
2002 Next 2 (TV Series) as Fedya
2003 Next 3 (TV Series) as Fedya
2007 Storm gate Young Wolfhound (TV Series) as sergeant Goldin
2007 Young Wolfhound (TV Series) as Stinky 
2008 Kiss Not For the Press as Alyosha 
2009 Next salamander as Biker
2009 Snow on the head as Igor
2010 Love in the Big City 2 as assistant duty officer for internal affairs
2010 Escape (TV Series) as Sergey Novikov
2011 Five Brides as Captain Ivan Mazaev
2011 White Crow (TV Series) as Larion Veber
2013 Apofegey as Yura Ivanushkin

References

External links
 

1983 births
Living people
Soviet male actors
Soviet male child actors
Russian male child actors
Russian male film actors
Russian male television actors
Russian male stage actors
Male actors from Moscow
20th-century Russian male actors
21st-century Russian male actors